Penicillium pachmariensis is a species of fungus in the genus Penicillium.

References

pachmariensis
Fungi described in 1996